Malice (Our Third Spell) is the second full-length album by the Norwegian black metal band Gehenna.

Track listing
"She Who Loves the Flames" - 5:00
"Made to Suffer" - 4:42
"Touched and Left for Dead" - 5:16
"Bleeding the Blue Flame" - 5:04
"Manifestation" - 4:50
"Ad Arma Ad Arma" - 14:00
"The Pentagram" - 5:46
"Malice" - 3:02
"The Word Became Flesh" - 4:53
"Before the Seventh Moon" - 5:43

Credits
Sanrabb - Lead Guitar, Vocals
Dolgar - Rhythm Guitar, Vocals
E.N. Death - Bass
Sarcana - Keyboards
Dirge Rep - Drums

References 

1996 albums
Gehenna (band) albums
Cacophonous Records albums